The Canadian federal budget for fiscal year 1982-1983 was presented by Minister of Finance Allan MacEachen in the House of Commons of Canada on 28 June 1982. The budget angered public sector unions by imposing a wage restraint package limiting wage increases to six and five percent in the following two years. (This was at a time when double-digit interest rates and inflation were common.)

External links 

 Budget Plan
 Budget Papers
 Budget in Brief

References

Canadian budgets
1982 in Canadian law
1982 government budgets
1982 in Canadian politics